For the comic book series titled "X-Men Classic," see Classic X-Men.
X-Men Classics is the name of two different series of 6-inch X-Men action figures by Toy Biz.

The first line was released in 2004 and consisted of comic accurate sculpts and paint applications. The line went on hiatus after 1 wave.

The line was revamped in 2005 and lasted 3 waves. It featured several new sculpts of both completely original costumes and previously unproduced costumes with repaints of existing figures scattered throughout.

Vehicles

See also
Marvel Legends
Spider-Man Classics
Hulk Classics
Iron Man: The Armored Avenger

References

External links

Overview and detailed pictures of the X-Men Classics line

Marvel Comics action figure lines